Dark Legacy may refer to:
 The Dark Legacy, an album by Paragon
 Gauntlet Dark Legacy, the sixth title in the Gauntlet arcade game series